Cesare Francalancia (born December 21, 1916 in Rome) was an Italian professional football player.

He played for 3 seasons (9 games) in the Serie A for A.S. Roma as a backup goalkeeper.

1916 births
Year of death missing
Italian footballers
Serie A players
A.S. Roma players
Association football goalkeepers